The Porter-class destroyers were a class of eight 1,850-ton large destroyers in the United States Navy. Like the preceding , their construction was authorized by Congress on 26 April 1916, but funding was delayed considerably. They were designed based on a 1,850-ton standard displacement limit imposed by the London Naval Treaty; the treaty's tonnage limit allowed 13 ships of this size, and the similar  was built later to meet the limit. The first four Porters were laid down in 1933 by New York Shipbuilding in Camden, New Jersey, and the next four in 1934 at Bethlehem Steel Corporation in Quincy, Massachusetts. All were commissioned in 1936 except Winslow, which was commissioned in 1937. They were built in response to the large Fubuki-class destroyers that the Imperial Japanese Navy was building at the time and were initially designated as flotilla leaders. They served extensively in World War II, in the Pacific War, the Atlantic, and in the Americas.  was the class' only loss, in the Battle of the Santa Cruz Islands on 26 October 1942.

Design
The larger destroyer leader type had been under active consideration since 1921. Indeed, the General Board recommended the construction of five of the type in that year. One factor in favor of leaders was the Navy's total lack of modern light cruisers, only partly alleviated by the ten  ships built in the 1920s. The General Board was very interested in equipping such a type with the new higher pressure and higher temperature steam propulsion equipment also proposed for the Farragut-class destroyers; this would extend the ships' range. The London Naval Treaty and large French destroyers (France did not sign the treaty and built ships well in excess of its limits) seem to have become the tipping points, with the 1930 recommendations beginning the cycle to actually build ships. The Geneva proposals for destroyers also seem to have influence the design, as the Destroyer Leader proposals limited themselves to 1,850 tons per the proposals; these tonnage limits were eventually included in the London treaty.

Engineering
Along with the improved fuel efficiency resulting from superheated steam, the four boilers included economizers to further extend the ships' range by preheating incoming feedwater. The main steam turbines were manufactured by New York Shipbuilding in the case of the ships built by that yard. However, as in the Farraguts, the main turbines had single reduction gearing and no cruising turbines, limiting their efficiency.

Armament

There were extensive discussions about the armament, the /25 caliber anti-aircraft (AA) gun being favored as being easy to work and train in a fast moving and lively type of ship. The other candidate was the 5-inch/51 caliber surface type, being very powerful but all but useless against aircraft.  It was a discussion made more interesting as the 5-inch/38 caliber dual purpose gun became available in the early 1930s and the Ordnance Department favored it rather strongly. The 5-inch/38 caliber gun was simply a 5-inch/25 caliber gun with the same projectiles and a longer barrel, but significantly increased range against both air and surface targets. The class was originally built with eight Mk 12 guns in four Mark 22 single purpose (surface action only) twin enclosed mounts; the single purpose mounts were adopted to save weight. Anti-aircraft protection was provided by two quadruple 1.1-inch (28 mm) mounts; in the 1930s this was considered sufficient. Although the Porters had the same eight  torpedo tubes as the Farraguts, a full set of reloads was carried. The class was initially equipped with the Mark 11 or Mark 12 torpedo, which were replaced by the Mark 15 beginning in 1938. The heavy armament proved top-heavy, and aircraft were becoming a greater threat, so during World War II on most of the class, mounts 51 and 54 were replaced with dual purpose (surface action and air action) twin mounts, and the original 1.1-inch guns were replaced with 40 mm Bofors and 20 mm Oerlikons.  In some ships, mount 52 was replaced by a quadruple 40 mm mount, and mount 53 became a single 5 in/38 cal dual purpose mount.  Additional 40 mm guns were added amidships along with 20 mm weapons. In most ships, four K-gun depth charge throwers were added to augment the as-built pair of depth charge racks. In some cases (DD-357, DD-359, DD-360) late in the war, the torpedo tubes, two K-guns, and one depth charge rack were landed, to accommodate additional light AA armament, for a total of sixteen 40 mm in three quadruple and two twin mounts and four 20 mm in two twin mounts.

Service
The class served in the Battle of the Atlantic, in the Pacific War, and escorted convoys in the Americas. Phelps was at the Battle of the Coral Sea and the Battle of Midway, scuttling the disabled aircraft carrier  with torpedoes at the former battle. Balch rescued survivors of the aircraft carrier  at Midway. Notable engagements for other ships of the class included the invasion of Guadalcanal and the Marianas campaign. By September 1944 the class was concentrated in the Atlantic.  was the class's only loss, in the Battle of the Santa Cruz Islands on 26 October 1942.  lost her bow to a torpedo in the Naval Battle of Vella Lavella on 6 October 1943, but was repaired. McDougal and Winslow were reclassified as AG-126 and AG-127 in September 1945 and modified for anti-kamikaze research in a similar configuration to  radar picket destroyers. All except Winslow were scrapped shortly after the war; Winslow remained in service as a training ship until 1950 and was scrapped in 1959.

Ships in class

See also

References

Citations

Sources

External links

Porter-class destroyers at Destroyer History Foundation
USS Porter, USS Selfridge, USS McDougal, and USS Winslow General Information Book with as-built data at Destroyer History Foundation
 "Goldplater" destroyers at Destroyer History Foundation
 1850-ton leader classes at Destroyer History Foundation
 Tin Can Sailors @ Destroyers.org - Porter class destroyer 
 NavSource Destroyer Photo Index Page

Destroyer classes